The 2010–11 Ohio State Buckeyes men's basketball team represented Ohio State University during the 2010–11 NCAA Division I men's basketball season. Their head coach was Thad Matta, in his 7th season with the Buckeyes. The team played its home games at the Jerome Schottenstein Center in Columbus, Ohio, and is a member of the Big Ten Conference.  The Buckeyes finished the regular season 32–2 and were ranked #1 overall in the media polls seven weeks during the season. The team won their second consecutive Big Ten regular season championship and Big Ten tournament championship. They entered the 2011 NCAA Division I men's basketball tournament as the overall #1 seed. They defeated Texas–San Antonio in the second round and George Mason in the third round to advance to the Sweet Sixteen where they were upset by Kentucky to finish the season 34–3.

Pre-season

Departures
The Ohio State Buckeyes lost a key player in Evan Turner in the 2010 NBA draft.  Turner left Ohio State after completing his junior season leading OSU to a 29–8 record and a trip to the Sweet Sixteen in the NCAA tournament.  Turner was selected second overall to the Philadelphia 76ers only behind former Kentucky Wildcat John Wall.  Other senior departs are noted below.

 #2 Jeremie Simmons – G
 #4 P.J. Hill – G
 #13 Danny Peters – G
 #15 Kyle Madson – C
 #34 Mark Titus – G

2010 Recruiting Class

Roster

Depth chart

2010–2011 Schedule

|-
!colspan=9 style=| Exhibition

|-
!colspan=12 style=| Regular season

|-
!colspan=9 style=| Big Ten tournament

|-
!colspan=9 style=| NCAA tournament

Game Notes – NCAA tournament

Second Round: UT–San Antonio

Ohio State began the 2011 NCAA tournament bid with a commanding 75–46 win of the University of Texas-San Antonio Roadrunners.  The Buckeyes were contested early however took control of the game halfway through the first half.  Leading 37–21 at halftime, the Buckeyes opened their lead and moved on to the third round of the tournament where they faced the George Mason Patriots.

Third round: George Mason

The third round showcased a match up between the #1 Ohio State Buckeyes and #8 George Mason Patriots.  George Mason opened the game on an 11–2 run and quickly took the momentum.  However, the overall seed in Ohio State would not back down.  Led by senior David Lighty and Jon Diebler, the Buckeyes quickly went on a run to end the first half of play with a 52–26 lead.  The pounding by the Buckeyes continued as they worked the ball around to their star freshmen in Jared Sullinger and Aaron Craft.  Ending the game as they had in the first half, Ohio State continued to cruise through and went on to win the game 98–66 in front of biased crowd in Cleveland, Ohio.

Regional semifinal: Kentucky

The Buckeyes reached the Sweet Sixteen for the second year in a row and for the second year they faced an SEC opponent.  Ohio State and Kentucky both began the game struggling to shoot and to get any sort of momentum going with both teams tied at 30 heading into the second half.  The second half remained an extremely close affair with neither team really able to pull away.  In the final second of the game Kentucky was able to put together a game winning shot and put the Wildcats ahead 62–60, which would be the final score in the game.  This loss ended the season for the Buckeyes, and for the second year in a row, Ohio State fell in the Sweet Sixteen.

Rankings

See also
2011 NCAA Division I men's basketball tournament
2010-11 NCAA Division I men's basketball season
List of NCAA Division I institutions

External links

Ohio State Buckeyes basketball

Ohio State Buckeyes men's basketball seasons
Ohio State
Ohio State
Ohio State Buckeyes
Ohio State Buckeyes
Big Ten men's basketball tournament championship seasons